Vogelsang is a  mountain in Bavaria, Germany. It is located in the Bernried municipality, south-west of the Regen district and north-east of Deggendorf.

It lies in the western foothills of the Bavarian Forest. Along with Butzen and Hinterberg, Vogelsang forms the boundary of the Graflinger Valley.

Other neighboring hills include Rauhe Kulm, Hochriedriegel, and Riedberg.

Mountains of Bavaria
Mountains of the Bavarian Forest